Dendropsophus coffeus is a species of frogs in the family Hylidae.

It is found in Bolivia and possibly Peru.
Its natural habitats are subtropical or tropical moist lowland forests and freshwater marshes.
It is threatened by habitat loss.

References

 

coffeus
Amphibians of Bolivia
Amphibians described in 2005
Taxonomy articles created by Polbot
Taxobox binomials not recognized by IUCN